Little Indian Run is a stream located entirely within Ritchie County, West Virginia.

Little Indian Run was named after the Native Americans (Indians) in the area.

See also
List of rivers of West Virginia

References

Rivers of Ritchie County, West Virginia
Rivers of West Virginia